This is a list of quantum computing terminology. 
 Qubit.
 Quantum circuit.
 Quantum logic gate.
 Topological quantum computer.

External links
Quantum Computing Glossary by Jack Krupansky

References

Institute of Electrical and Electronics Engineers